Kernu Parish was a rural municipality in north-western Estonia. It was a part of Harju County. The municipality had a population of 2,077 (as of 1 January 2009) and covered an area of 174.65 km². The population density was 11.9 inhabitants per km².

There were 17 villages in Kernu Parish: Allika, Haiba, Hingu, Kaasiku, Kabila, Kernu, Kibuna, Kirikla, Kohatu, Kustja, Laitse, Metsanurga, Mõnuste, Muusika, Pohla, Ruila, Vansi.

Local government
The mayor was is Enn Karu and chairman of the council was Karl-Erik Tender.

Symbolism
The main symbol in the arm of Kernu Parish was golden vat (est: Kirn). It symbolised the historical first owner of Kernu (his name was Kirnu).

Education
There were two primary schools (in Kernu and in Ruila), kindergarten (in Haiba) and children's home (in Haiba) in the municipality.

Kernu primary school established in the year 1869 and it is situated 39 km from Tallinn. Principal of the school is Ene Rooma (year 2005).

Ruila primary school established in the year 1871 and it is situated 25 km from Tallinn. Principal of the school is Tiia Roosenberg (year 2005). Today, the Ruila Basic School has over 120 students.

Haiba kindergarten "Riisikas" is situated centre of Haiba village.

The Haiba Children's Home completed in 1999 is a home for 40 children from Harju County.

Sight-seeing
 
 Rock of Uku
 Laitse manor house

References

External links
 Kernu Parish official website (available only in Estonian)
 Ruila primary school official website (available only in Estonian)

Former municipalities of Estonia